Michelle Despain Hoeger (born 5 November 1984) is an Argentine-American luge athlete who competed for Argentina in the 2006 Winter Olympics. Her husband is Chris Hoeger.

Despain, whose mother is from Argentina and father is from Utah, was born in Rosario, Argentina and grew up in Provo, Utah. Despain is a Latter-day Saint.

Despain worked for Isagenix, a consumer products firm in Chandler, Arizona, in the customer service department. Her father is vice president of marketing for the company. She graduated with an associate degree from Utah Valley State College in 2004 and a Bachelor of Science in Psychology from Brigham Young University in 2006.

Despain has been competing in the luge since 2003 at the age of 19. She finished 29th in the women's singles event at the 2005 FIL World Luge Championships in Park City, Utah.  She finished 24th of 32 competitors in the women's singles event at the 2006 Winter Olympics in Turin, Italy.

References

 2006 luge women's singles results
 Deseret Morning News February 1, 2006 article on Despain competing for Argentina in the 2006 Winter Olympics
 FIL-Luge profile
 Isagenix profile
 The-sports.org profile
 Utah Valley University profile

External links 
 
 
 

1984 births
Living people
Argentine female lugers
American female lugers
Argentine emigrants to the United States
Argentine Latter Day Saints
Brigham Young University alumni
Latter Day Saints from Arizona
Latter Day Saints from Utah
Lugers at the 2006 Winter Olympics
Olympic lugers of Argentina
Sportspeople from Chandler, Arizona
Sportspeople from Provo, Utah
Sportspeople from Rosario, Santa Fe
Utah Valley University alumni